MKS Dąbrowa Górnicza, is the women's volleyball department of Polish sports club MKS Dąbrowa Górnicza based in Dąbrowa Górnicza and plays in the Orlen Liga.

Previous names
Due to sponsorship, the club have competed under the following names:
 Miejski Międzyszkolny Klub Sportowy (MMKS) Dąbrowa Górnicza (1992–2007)
 MKS Dąbrowa Górnicza (2007–2009)
 Enion Energia MKS Dąbrowa Górnicza (2009–2010)
 Tauron MKS Dąbrowa Górnicza (2010–2013)
 Tauron Banimex MKS Dąbrowa Górnicza (2013–2015)
 Tauron MKS Dąbrowa Górnicza (2015–present)

History
MKS Dąbrowa Górnicza (originally named ) a sports club was founded in 1992 with various sports departments, including volleyball. It started competing with youth teams in regional leagues and due to the popularity of the sport amongst the secondary schools in the town, the club developed quickly and progressed through the lower national leagues until it reached the highest league in 2007. The club was renamed  and have won the Polish Cup twice (2011–12, 2012–13) and the Polish Super Cup twice (2012, 2013). The club has also often featured in European competitions since its first appearance in 2009.

Honours

National competitions
  Polish Cup: 2
2011–12, 2012–13

  Polish Super Cup: 2
2012, 2013

Team
Season 2016–2017, as of February 2017.
 Head Coach :  Juan Manuel Serramalera (until February 2017),  Magdalena Śliwa (from February 2017)

References

External links

 Official website 
 Profile at CEV

Volleyball clubs established in 1992
1992 establishments in Poland
Women's volleyball teams in Poland
Dąbrowa Górnicza
Sport in Silesian Voivodeship